Sharon Drucker (born July 26, 1967) is an Israeli professional basketball coach.

Personal life
His brother, Raviv Drucker is a journalist.

He was married to Hadas and they have two children. Now married to Tsipi Karlik and they have one son.

Titles
 Israeli Coach of the Year 2000
 ULEB Cup 2004 - Hapoel Jerusalem
 EuroCup Challenge 2006 - Ural Great
 Belgian League 2007 - Oostende
 Belgian Cup 2008 - Oostende
 Israeli League 2009 - Maccabi Tel Aviv (assistant)

References

1967 births
Living people
Aris B.C. coaches
BC Rytas coaches
Hapoel Jerusalem B.C. coaches
Israeli basketball coaches
Israeli Jews
Israeli men's basketball players
Israeli people of Indian-Jewish descent
Jewish men's basketball players
People from Petah Tikva